The 2010 elections for the Pennsylvania House of Representatives were held on November 2, 2010, with all districts being contested. Necessary primary elections were held on May 18, 2010. The term of office for those elected in 2010 will run from January 4, 2011, until November 30, 2012. State Representatives are elected for two-year terms, with the entire House of Representatives up for election every two years.

Make-Up of the House

2010 General election

References

External links
 2010 General Election, Representative in the General Assembly (Pennsylvania Department of State)

2010 Pennsylvania elections
2010
Pennsylvania House of Representatives